"Proudest Monkey" is a song by the Dave Matthews Band, featured on the 1996 album Crash.

Origins
"Proudest Monkey" has its roots in a live soundcheck done before the audience at a gig at Williams College on December 11, 1993. The band arrived two hours late for the gig due to becoming lost on an alternate route they were forced to take when a snowstorm struck the area. As a result, the band jammed the music that would later become "Proudest Monkey" to test their equipment, with Matthews making up lyrics on the spot. This performance was ultimately labeled "Route 2" by tapers, after the road the band used to reach the gig.

Matthews later kept that experience in mind when reworking the lyrics to the song, establishing the image of the monkey as a metaphor for the entrapment he and the band were feeling at the time (both the literal, in being trapped on a bus in the snowy mountains; and the symbolic, in being trapped in a seemingly endless cycle of repetitive performing, and thus feeling limited in their music). Dave would eventually write about monkeys later in songs like "Big Eyed Fish", "Shake Me Like a Monkey" and the unreleased "Monkey Man".

Live performances
After a number of teases and partial performances, "Proudest Monkey" debuted proper on December 29, 1994 during a show at the Grady Cole Center in Charlotte, North Carolina, albeit with unfinished lyrics. The song would make appearances at shows throughout 1995, gradually evolving into the extended jam form that it would take when it was recorded for Crash.

While the song was a staple of Matthews's tours with Tim Reynolds until 1999, the song remained one of the rarer tracks to appear in concert with the full band after 1995, though it did see some play during the main tours by the band until 1999 as well. After that, it was played very sparingly, except for appearances at some shows in the summer of 2002. However, the addition of Rashawn Ross as a regular guest artist to the band's tours in 2006 resulted in the return to the touring rotation of a number of songs of which brass instruments were a key component; one of which was "Proudest Monkey", and the song enjoyed its most exposure in a full band setting since 1995.

Official live releases
Live at Red Rocks 8.15.95
Summer 1995 concert
features guest Tim Reynolds
Live Trax Vol. 5
Summer 1995 concert (8.23.95)
features guest David Ryan Harris
Live Trax Vol. 4
Crash release show on April 30, 1996
Live Trax Vol. 6
2-night Summer 2006 stand at Boston's Fenway Park
features guests Butch Taylor and Rashawn Ross
Live Trax 2008
Live at Mile High Music Festival
features Tim Reynolds and Rashawn Ross on flugelhorn.
Live Trax Vol. 15
Live Trax Vol. 18
Live Trax Vol. 21
Live Trax Vol. 23
acoustic version featuring Tim Reynolds
Live Trax Vol. 24
acoustic version featuring Tim Reynolds
Live Trax Vol. 25
Live Trax Vol. 27
Live in New York City (Dave Matthews Band album)
Weekend on the rocks (2005)

References

External links
DMB Almanac Listing
Guitar Tabs @ DMBTabs.com
Lyrics and Song History @ antsmarching.org

Proudest Monkey
1996 songs
Songs written by Dave Matthews
Song recordings produced by Steve Lillywhite
Songs written by Carter Beauford
Songs written by Stefan Lessard
Songs written by LeRoi Moore
Songs written by Boyd Tinsley